Robert Bertie may refer to:

 Robert Bertie (of Benham) (1677–1710), Member of Parliament for Westbury
 Robert Bertie, 1st Earl of Lindsey (1583–1642)
 Robert Bertie, 3rd Earl of Lindsey (1641–1701)
 Robert Bertie, 1st Duke of Ancaster and Kesteven (1660–1723)
 Robert Bertie, 4th Duke of Ancaster and Kesteven (1756–1779)
 Lord Robert Bertie (1721–1782), Army general and Member of Parliament